Minas da Panasqueira or Mina da Panasqueira  (Panasqueira Mine) is the generic name for a set of mining operations between Cabeço do Pião (Fundão Municipality) and the village of Panasqueira (Covilhã Municipality), which operated in a technically integrated manner and continue practically since its discovery. Subsequently, it was agglomerated into a single administrative entity called Couto Mineiro da Panasqueira which had its last demarcation on 9 March 1971 and later in the present Exploration Concession C18 (16/12/1992). The mining installations are currently centralised in the area of Barroca Grande-Aldeia de S. Francisco de Assis (Covilhã) i.e. access to underground exploration, extraction and processing of ore.

The mine has been in operation since 1901 in a practically uninterrupted manner, with a strong impact on the identity, history and present society of the Beira Interior in general and the Cova da Beira in particular. It is also a worldwide reference in the wolfram sector, not only for the quality and volume of production, duration and adaptability of exploration; but also due to the maturity of technical solutions for both underground exploitation and ore processing.

History

Name Origin 

Minas da Panasqueira (Panasqueira Mine) is named after the location of initial mining exploration. At the end of the 19th century the area was covered with gorse, broom bush and several species of low-lying bushes and pines. The stony ground was totally unsuitable for cultivation of seed or cereal. The population of the neighbouring village of Cebola (presently S. Jorge da Beira) used the folds in the slopes to make terraces where they planted potatoes, corn or pasture. In this manner small cultivation areas divided in narrow terraces with some fruit trees and large chestnut trees were created in the three small valleys of (Madurrada, Vale Torto and Panasqueira).

In Panasqueira the ore exploration work began and the first plant was installed. The name of this valley derives from "panasco", name given to several graminoid plants very common in the region in fields where rye was sowed. The population called this initial mine "Minas da Panasqueira".

Pre-industrial period
Records exist of extensive galleries in Vale da Ermida, Fontes Casinhas and Courelas associated with the exploration for tin, but this period is poorly documented. There is record of alluvial exploration of tin in the area of S. Jorge da Beira that was attributed to the Roman period.

Discovery
At the end of the 19th century, the region was covered with thick heather scrub, broom, arbutus and pine trees used in the production of vegetable charcoal for sale in Fundão and Covilhã. One of these colliers, known as “O Pescão de Casegas”, found a shiny black stone and took it to Manuel dos Santos, in the Parish of Barroca do Zêzere. After visiting the area, Manuel dos Santos went to Lisbon and asked Professor of Mineralogy Engº. Silva Pinto, to examine the area where the sample was discovered. On his return, Manuel dos Santos bought the land and began the exploration for wolfram. Exploration was done in an artisanal manner and complemented by ore that the shepherds picked up elsewhere and sold to Manuel dos Santos.

When Engº. Silva Pinto arrived at the site and saw the abundance of wolframite he bought all the lands and the ore collected from Manuel dos Santos, carrying out the first mining registration in the name of Firma Almeida Silva Pinto e Comandita. Its publication was made on the 25 November 1898.

The work proceeded on a larger scale with exploration of outcropping veins and a very rudimentary manual plant employing almost 100 people. At a later date the concession was sold to the banker Henrique Burnay, 1st Earl of Burnay. Exploration increased in size with the preparation of veins and expansion of surface installations. In 1901 the concession was leased to a British company for a short period. Subsequently, the first mechanical steam plant was assembled. The first galleries (drives) (nº 10 and nº 13) date from this time. There are no production records but a shipping record dated 25 November 1909 indicated 41 tons of wolfram concentrates; a notable amount for an exploration of the time. From then on, one can identify some well-defined periods in the history of the Panasqueira mine.

1911-1928 Wolfram Mining and Smelting 

A sales deed of the company The Wolfram Mining and Smelting Company Limited with 11 concessions and 125 ha of land, was signed on the 15th July 1911.  
The term of Wolfram Mining and Smelting Company was a period of great development with the opening of several galleries (drives), expansion and modernization of plants and installation of a 5.1 km aerial cable. The statements of 1912 are representative of a typical year of that time and indicates an annual production of 277 t of concentrates with 65% WO3, 1,078 m galleries and a total of 244 workers.
With the beginning of the First World War  and consequent increase in Wolfram price, there was an increase in production which stabilised during this period in values close to 30 t per month of concentrate.  The number of direct workers in the company stood at 800, plus approximately 200 self-employed workers.  
At the end of the First World War (1918-1919) with the drop of prices, production paralysed, and the labour force was reduced to 100 workers employed in accessory work.  From 1920 to 1923 there was a period of intense exploration, followed by almost paralysation in 1923,  reactivated in 1924 and near complete paralysation in 1926. At this time tin exploration began, first in Fontes Casinhas and later elsewhere.

1928-1973 Beralt Tin and Wolfram Limited

In 1928 with the entry of new shareholders, the name was changed and important work begins such as a new aerial cable and a plant with large dimensions in Rio (Cabeço do Pião). Production returns to values close to 30 t of concentrate per month. New production stoppage period from 1931 to 1934. At this time a tin smelting furnace was installed in Rio.  
In 1934 there was a new increase of the wolfram prices and consequent growth of the activity in the three main exploration areas of the concession (Panasqueira, Barroca Grande and Rio). This cycle associated with the Second World War was remarkable with 750 workers in 1934; 4,457 in 1942 and 10,540 workers in 1943. The Plant at Rio reached a capacity of 300 t per day and Panasqueira 1,000 t per day. The monthly production of concentrates reached 300 t, more than the rest of the country. It is at that time that the connection is made Underground from Barroca Grande to Panasqueira. At the time of the Second World War, Panasqueira was the largest mine in the country and one of the largest wolfram mines in the world. The price of the wolfram dropped drastically at the end of the Second World War, only increasing again in 1950 due to the Korean War. During this period there was a great modernization of the company with the introduction of scrapers and mechanical loaders. Mules were replaced by locomotives. The production of cassiterite was increased to compensate the low prices of wolfram. The production of copper concentrates began in 1962. 
From 1957 to 1965 there was a further decrease in the price of wolfram which resulted in a reduction of production in order to control cost. During this period the company increased the production of tin to compensate the low wolfram prices. In 1966, there was a positive evolution that peaked in 1970 and this corresponded to a period of expansion. However, soon afterwards prices suddenly dropped again. During this period the production was stockpiled instead of selling below the production price, but due to the financial expenses it was decided to increase the capital with the entry of new Shareholders.

1973-1990 Beralt Tin and Wolfram Portugal

The company changed its name in 1973 with the acquisition of 20% of the capital by BNU (Banco Nacional Ultramarino). In 1974 when the price became more favorable the stocks at the mine were sold. Since 1974, there was a considerable increase in labour costs that lead to the acceleration of the mechanization of underground operations. During the 70s several alternatives were studied for deepening of the mine and Level 2 was opened and extraction was carried out through an inclined shaft that began operation in 1982. From 1983 the price began to weaken again and Charter Consolidated holder of 80% of the shares sold its participation in 1990 to Minorco.

1990-1993 Minorco
In 1993, due to several years of low wolfram prices, Minorco requested permission from the General Directorate of Mines to close the mine and submitted an application for authorization to sell the plant as scrap and to disconnect the sewage from level 3. Due to the reply from the General Directorate of Mines that the requested actions could only take place after the establishment of the mine closure conditions (maintenance period for the two water treatment plants at the mine and a water quality monitoring program in the Bodelhão Stream and Zêzere River), Minorco decided to sell the company to Avocet Mining.

1993-2004 Avocet Mining
Major changes took place during the initial period of Avocet, namely the reopening of the mine in January 1994, the transfer of the Plant from Rio to Barroca Grande, the continuation of the opening of Level 3 and the construction of an extraction shaft between Levels 2 And 3, which began operations in 1998.

The final period of Avocet management was of major economical difficulty due to the extremely low and persistent wolfram prices with a deterioration of the production capacity of the mine which, coupled with the termination on 31 December 2003 of contracts with customers that guaranteed the sale of the production at a price above the market value, led the Company to notify the Direcção Geral de Minas (General Directorate of Mines) of its intention to close of the Mine from 1 January 2004. Following negotiations, and based on well-founded expectations that within six months there would be an increase in prices, the State guaranteed the payment of the workers' salaries between March and August 2004 through the Wage Guarantee Fund, which created conditions for the recovery and acquisition of the mine by Almonty.

2004-2007 Almonty

From May 2004 to October 2007 the American group Almonty managed the mines through its representative Primary Metals. During this period the productive capacity of the mines was restored and production of Level 2 was resumed.

2007-2016 Sojitz Corporation

The Japanese company Sojitz Corporation acquired the Panasqueira Mines in October 2007 and sold it back to Almonty in January 2016. During this period the company changed its name to Sojitz Beralt Tin and Wolfram Portugal. Exploration was carried out in a very extensive area of the mine, returning to previously abandoned levels, i.e. Levels 1 and 0. Mining prospection was carried out to identify additional reserves within and surrounding the mining concession. Exploration of tailings that contained interesting wolfram grades was done in the old plant of the Village of the Panasqueira. In 2008, part of the concession that was located south of the Zêzere River was disannexated.  Management of the old infrastructures become the responsibility of the Municipality of Fundão, however the mining company is responsible for the monitoring of the water of the Zêzere River and the control of acidic runoff.

2016 to the present Almonty Industries

Almonty Industries is the current owner of Panasqueira Mine, acquiring the Mine on 6 January 2016, and once again changing the name to Beralt Tin and Wolfram. During this period exploration continued in a very extensive area of the mine between levels 0 and 3, resuming the exploration of an older area rich in tin in the northern zone of Level 2, known as Panasqueira Deep. The possibility of recovering several metals contained in the slimes dams, especially wolfram, tin and copper, is being studied at the moment.

Directors and other historically influential people

Historical Mining Production

There are no reliable records of mining production between 1898 and 1933; however it is known, that it was relevant in some years during this period. In the period that is recorded (1934 to present) 128.110 t of wolfram concentrates, 6.576 t of tin concentrates and 32.410 t of copper concentrates were produced. The wolfram concentrates produced have an average of 75% WO3, tin concentrates have an average of 74% Sn and copper concentrates have an average of 28-30% Cu.
Along with these main products, minerals for collections are also extracted and gravel is sold as inert for the civil construction. Panasqueira Mines is the only wolfram mine in Portugal since 1985, and from 1950 until the end of 2016 were responsible for 77% of the country's total wolfram production.

The main commercialized product, wolfram concentrates (wolframite in the case of Panasqueira) are a reference in the industry as they have the highest grade and purity in the world in the last decades. They are generally paid at a superior price in relation to market concentrate prices and chosen by the manufacturers of intermediate or final products when a special purity of the raw material is required.

Minerals for Collection

The Panasqueira mine is also a reference in mineral collection and the minerals are notable for their size, excellent crystallization and variety. In the veins  of Panasqueira Mine almost all the silicates identified until today are found, as well as two minerals that until the present date were only identified in the Panasqueira Mine. They are  Panasqueirite and Thadeuite. Almost all the best mineral collections in the world include specimens from Panasqueira highlighting wolframites, in the variety of ferberite and fluorapatite.
The collection of specimens of collectible quality is done daily, whenever possible, and as the underground exploration works advance. 
Most of them are found in cavities in the veins, which in mining slang takes the designation of ("rotos") of variable size (centimeter to metric) and random occurrence.
The reason for this quality and perfection in the crystallization process is due to the high amount of volatile elements present in the mineralogy of the Panasqueira veins, which allows, under suitable temperature and pressure conditions, the formation of said cavities.

Museum

As an initiative of the Parish of the Village of São Francisco de Assis, and in collaboration with the company, there has been musealization of several spaces related to the mine where photos and other objects related to the mine can be observed along its history.  Highlighting the old fuel tank (deactivated) that was transformed into a 3-story building in the form of a carbide lamp, containing several exhibition spaces. . 
Since 2006 there are various rooms with permanent exhibition relating to the Panasqueira Mine in the National Museum of Natural History and Science in Lisbon. There are excellent collections of minerals from Panasqueira in other museums in Portugal such as LNEG in S. Mamede da Infesta.
 
Many of the best museums in the world, with mineral collections have Panasqueira species. Good species can be seen in the American Museum of Natural History in New York or in the Museum of Natural History in London.

Location
The Panasqueira Mine is located in the Municipality of Covilhã, District of Castelo Branco between the mountain ranges of S. Pedro do Açor and Gardunha. The mining concession is called  "C-18 Exploration Contract" with an area of 1,913 Ha. The lowest point of the mining concession is located along the Zêzere River at 360m and the highest at the geographic setting of Chiqueiro at 1,086m. The landscape is covered with extensive plantations of eucalyptus and pine trees and with small terraces planted with olive trees, vineyard and some fruit trees. The mine is the largest local employer with approximately 300 direct workers.  The workers reside mainly in the surrounding villages: such as: Barroca Grande, S. Jorge da Beira, Silvares, Unhais-o-Velho or Dornelas do Zêzere.

Geology

Regional Geology

With regard to the occurrence of the mineralizations in W and Sn in Portugal, the "Província metalogenética estano-tungstífera Ibérica" (Iberian tin-tungsten-metallographic province) extends to the east of the shear Porto-Coimbra-Tomar and to the northeast of the Juromenha thrust. With the exception of the deposits linked to the granite of St.ª Eulália (ZOM - Zona de Ossa Morena – Ossa Morena Zone), the remainder are located in the Zona Centro-Iberica (Central-Iberian Zone) (ZCI), Zona Galiza Média-Trás-os-Montes (ZGMTM) and Zona Asútrico-Ocidental-Leonesa (Astúrico-occidental-leonesa zone) (ZAOL). The Portuguese tin-tungsten metallographic province develops throughout the central and northern region of Portugal where the vein deposits are undoubtedly of greater economic importance.
The ZGMTM and ZCI are essentially differentiated by the occurrence of thrust of allochthonous and parauthoctone character in the ZGMTM. Most of the outcropping rocks are granite and schist of the Schist Greywacke Complex.  To a lesser extent are Pre-Cambrian, Ordovician and Silurian rocks.
The distribution of hydrothermal mineralization hydrothermal mineralization of tin and wolfram is extensive and follows, in addition to the parallel alignments of the Variscan Variscan structuring, to the location of Variscan granitic outcrops or generally found in contact metamorphism halo reflecting the presence of granites at small depth (Panasqueira, Argemela, Gois, Borralha, Vale das Gatas, Ribeira, Argozelo, amongst others).
Mineralization occurs both in the contact zone of intrusive granites and metasediments, as over the contact zone of intrusive granites in other older granites.
The main occurrences of W and Sn are conditioned by structures inherited from early and late Variscan shears or fractures related to the installation of post-tectonic granites.

Local Geology 

The geological map of Portugal at the scale of 1:500,000 shows the contact between the Schist-Greywacke Complex of the "Beiras Group" and the Variscan Granitic Complex of the North of Portugal. The "Beiras Group" is formed by a dense series of thin lentils of marine origin, of clay and sandstones, that later suffered Metamorfismo regional low grade regional metamorphism  (facies of the green schist) during the initial compressive phases of the Variscan orogeny.
The Panasqueira mines are located in the area of the Schist-Greywacke Complex of the Beiras Group, in Central Iberian Zone (ZCI). It is a region where metamorphism sedimentary formations Rocha sedimentar predominates, but where there is also a large number of acidic and basic eruptive manifestations. The age of metasediments is attributed to the Cambrian or Superior Precambrian.

There are basic intrusive rocks that have been identified as dolerites Diábase and which occur in the form of veins 0.5 to 3m thick, with an orientation predominantly N-S and vertical inclination. They are dark grey, fine grain and micro-porphyritic, being altered in the contact with the mineralized veins. They present irregular fractures and polyhedral disjunction. Mineralogically they are essentially formed by labradorite, hornblenda, chlorite Chlorite group and amphibolitized pyroxene. They do not affect the mineralization and are intersected by the hydrothermal vein system. These dykes follow the two phases of deformation. 
In the eastern zone of Couto Mineiro, there are spotted schist with spots of biotite and chlorite, and less frequently of chiastolite Chiastolite and cordierite Cordierite corresponding to a contact metamorphism halo, which was considered as an indication of the presence of an intrusion of an in-depth magmatic body.

Orebody

Formation
The sub-horizontal arrangement of the vein field was controlled by pre-existing fracturing due to early deformation or by the associated stress field caused intrusion of granite.
The intruding granite heated and elevated the pore pressures of nearby rocks, causing a network of radial fractures to open around the intrusive centre, allowing entry of granitic rocks into the fractures to form dikes and sills.

In the following phase, when the pressure of the intruding magma and the confining stresses in surrounding country rock equilabrate, there is a decrease in fluid pressure and consequently the future ore body is sheared and further fractured. The fluids hydrothermally alter the granite dome – greisenisation.
Finally, the intrusion solidifies and contraction of the intrusion occurs due to cooling. This is the situation at Panasqueira, where the inclined radial structures are the precursors of the “galo” veins and the reopening of the sub-horizontal fractures gave rise to the veins.

It is therefore considered, that the swarm veins may be an example of a flat vein field installed during the consolidation phase, in which, due to the cooling of the intrusive massive and dynamic propagation of fractures generates sub-horizontal traction flaws and reopens others already existent.

Morphology of veins
The Panasqueira deposit consists in a sequence of quartz veins, notable for its size and the abundance of mineral paragenesis. In this way, the mineralized zone of W-Sn-(Cu) consists of sub-horizontal quartz veins (usually with an inclination of less than 25º, however they can present values of 30 to 40º, near the greisenized cupola) that it overlaps and fills fractures mainly developed in schist rocks, with an average of 25 cm thick (ranging from 1 to 150 cm) and a horizontal extension that can reach 200m, being on average 48m. The most important mineral in economical terms, object of exploration is tungsten (volframite); tin (cassiterite) and copper (chalcopyrite) are by-products of the exploration.

In addition to these minerals, there is a great variety of other minerals such as: muscovite, topaz, fluorite, arsenopyrite, pyrite, pyrrhotite, marcasite, sphalerite, apatite, siderite, calcite and dolomite.

Also highlight, a type of morphology very typical in these veins, called "Rabo de Enguia – Eel’s Tail". This morphology consists of pressure-induced throttling, often resulting in the precipitation of tungsten and cassiterite at the extremities. They regularly display a structure that suggests different filling phases related to reopening events.

The veins that present a greater inclination (30º to 40º), found near the greisenized cupola are called "Galo" veins. Usually these types of veins are also well mineralized. Sometimes they show variable gradients between 1 and 5m and, after dipping these veins return to normal, that is, horizontal.
A different and relatively frequent structure in both the Mine and the surrounding area are quartz structures called "Seixo Bravo". This connotation is mainly due to the hardness it presents and to the fact that they do not present useful mineralization. These are lenticular, irregular, with sub-vertical inclination, structures whose arrangement is in agreement with the main schistosity and there width can easily reach 3m. It is an exudation quartz, barren, product of segregation and recrystallization of quartz by regional metamorphism. They are prior to mineralized veins and often form 90º angles.

Mineral associations
The establishment of a deposition sequence for the minerals of the Panasqueira veins is quite difficult due to the existence of different stages of formation and to the fact that some of them only appear in certain areas of the Couto Mineiro, making their correlation very difficult. However, Kelly & Rye (1979) defined, for the mineralogy of the Panasqueira veins, four stages of deposition:

1.	Formation Stage of oxides and silicates: it is the most significant stage from an economical point of view, as it is in this one that the formation of wolframite and cassiterite occurs. In this stage, the majority of quartz and muscovite, as well as tourmaline, topaz and a large part of arsenopyrite, are formed in at least two generations. 
2.	Formation stage of major sulfides: the predominant minerals are sulphides, especially pyrite, chalcopyrite, sphalerite, stannite and phyrrhotite and, to a lesser extent, galena. One can also find new generations of arsenopyrite, already in a third generation, muscovite and quartz. The final phase of this stage corresponds, essentially, to the end of the deposition of apatite. 
3. 	Alteration stage of phyrrhotite: fundamentally characterized by the alteration of phyrrhotite, from which results mainly siderite and marcasite, due to the iron released in the alteration process. Added to this iron is the iron released in the dissolution of the pyrite-I giving rise to a second generation of pyrite, magnetite and hematite. In this phase, alteration of stannite due to reaction with the siderite, forming covellite, chalcopyrite and cassiterite also occurs. It is also at this stage that the silver salts usually associated with bismuthinite and accompanied by sphalerite and / or chalcopyrite are deposited. 
4.	Formation stage of late carbonates: characterized by the formation of carbonates, mainly calcite and dolomite, the latter in mixed crystals, that is, with the siderite nucleus, as well as fluorite; it is in this stage that chlorite is formed. Later generations of sulphides were also observed, however, always in small amounts.

Faults
From the structural point of view, the Couto Mineiro region is characterized by the occurrence of a large number of faults and fractures, locally well marked, indicating type of composition their orientation. Must refer the directions of the two major fault systems: those belonging to the N-S system and those belonging to the NE-SW to the ENE-WSW system. The Falha Principal (Main Fault), Fault 3W, Fault 1W, Fonte da Lameiras Fault and Vale das Freiras Fault belong to the first; Cebola Fault and Fault 8E belong to the second. It is thought that the latter were initiated with shut-off movements, strike-slip type during the Variscan episode and reactivated during Alpine Orogeny. It is a complex of left shear zone, which affects the Ordovician formations of Serra do Vidual to SW, and joining NE with the Manteigas - Unhais da Serra shear zone. At NNW of this accidents any outcropping of mineralized veins are recognised, either to tungsten or tin.

Resources and reserves

Organization of Mining Infrastructures

Mining has always been done by underground methods. The exception was a small exploration in mixed method (glory holes)  for tin in Vale de Ermida in the 50s. The extraction galleries are horizontal and since the junction of the two main historical exploration areas (Panasqueira and Barroca Grande) with the Main Gallery of Barroca Grande; that it is called Level 0. Level 1 was then traced and then Level 2 and Level 3. The distance between these levels is 60m as previously the opening systems of the chimneys (raises) were complex and dangerous. With the acquisition in 1974 of a Raise Borer the distance between levels (Level 3) increased to 90m. There is a drainage level at the mine (Level 530), 30m below Level 2 where in past mining was also done. All the drainage from the mine leaves through this gallery. Upper-level water runs by gravity while runoff waters below the drainage level are routed to a pumping station installed below Level 3 of the mine. Horizontally the galleries of the various levels form an orthogonal mesh in which galleries roughly N-S are called "pannels" and galleries roughly E-W are called "drives".

Extraction of ore to the surface was done by tunnels above Level 0 and then through several vertical shaft. With the relocation of production areas to southwest of the plant, in order to reduce the operational complexity of the various extraction shafts, increase capacity and centralize the extraction with modern means closer to the new center of gravity of the exploration areas, a crushing chamber was installed (530m elevation) and a 17% sloped conveyor belt that transports the crushed ore to several surface storage bins that feeds the plant and allows the necessary flexibility between the mine and the plant. This system, began operation in 1981 and is still in use today. For ore extraction below Level 2 (Level 3) a sub-vertical shaft installed in 1996 (Poço Eng. Cláudio dos Reis) is used, which brings the ore up to level 2 (560m).

Mining Methods

The ore is mined in stopes by drilling and blasting with explosives and loaded by LHD's to storage and extraction bins which are disposed in a regular manner and fill 4 ton ore cars. The ore cars circulate between Levels 2 and 3, emptying the ore into the crushing chamber in Level 2. The ore cars are drawn by battery or diesel locomotives.
The large size of the vein field and the characteristic of being Panasqueira's very homogeneous veins throughout the mineralized zone, allowed the systematization and mechanization of exploration from the initial phase of the mining exploration. This was essential for the survival and remarkable persistence of the mine, in a sector that has experienced severe difficulties in the last decades due to the change of the mining industry standard in the European Union.
Since unification of the exploration and systematization of the mining method that the following stoping methods can be pointed out:

Longwall
During the 50s this method was widespread throughout the mine. According to the inclination of the veins, used: parallel fronts (for sub-horizontal veins) or irregular fronts, also called "modas e bordados"(fashions and embroideries) (for veins with a slope between 7º and 12º). Wooden ore cars circulated within the stope (manual filling) that transported the ore to the bins where it dropped by gravity to the Lower Scrolling Level. Mechanical drilling was done with compressed air jacklegs and the start off was done, as today by explosives. When filling the ore cars the waste was chosen remaining as a wall that accompanied the advancement of the excavation constituting the structure responsible for the support of the cavity. This method had several drawbacks such as the requirement of a lot of labour and the loss of the finer fraction of the ore as it was violently thrown against the stone walls. The method was improved in order to find solutions for the loss of this finer fraction and consequently more mineralized.

Fronts with Convergencing Faces 
1958 marked a major evolution in the mining method, due to the lack of labor caused by the immigration. Mechanisation was necessary with the adaptation of scrapers that had great capacity of transport, versatility and a greater radius of action. For the use of scrapers the stopes adopted a system of converging faces for the storage and extraction chimney. This variant that in Panasqueira was known as "Bacalhau - cod" reached double. This was the system used throughout most of the 60s and resulted in an increase in productivity of 40% in relation to the initial longwall method.

Room and Pillar - Initial Phase
The construction of walls to support the ceiling was a totally manual work and consumed approximately 60% of the labor applied in stoping. The importance of investigating another support system that allowed at the same time greater mechanization of the other stoping operations resulted in the transition to room and pillar. The pillars successively reduced their size and for the final phase of stoping two methods of support were tested: reinforced concrete columns formed by overlapping inserts and piles of wood stacked in various forms. The concrete columns were abandoned almost immediately due to their cost and lack of elasticity that led to sudden breaks. The wooden piles gave better results and were first implemented together with the stone walls and then separately.

Room and Pillar – Current method

The room and pillar method allowed an increasing mechanization of stoping operations that led to the use of drilling machines, first by compressed air and then electro-hydraulic. It also allowed the use of loaders, first by compressed air, then electrical and presently diesel. The cost of labor and materials associated to the wooden piles for total recovery of the ore, is the reason why residual pillars with ore (16%) are left behind, leading to an 84% recovery of the deposit.

Currently all stope work is mechanized and the stopping sequence is carried out in five phases:

1st Phase - Opening of recognition galleries along the vein (inclines) obtaining confirmation of the actual grade of a vein or vein zone as well as its exact geometry (measured resources). In this phase the infrastructures such as electrical supply, compressed air and ventilation are assembled. 
2nd Phase - Opening of exploration galleries in an orthogonal mesh, leaving between them columns of 11m by 11m. This is done until the full definition of the exploitable zones of a given vein is achieved. 
3rd Phase – At the end of the 2nd Phase, when the stopes above are already mined, the 11 by 11m pillars are cut in half by a gallery, which is always 5m wide, resulting in rectangular pillars with dimensions of 11m by 3m. 
4th Phase - The rectangular pillars of 11m by 3m are cut in half by a new gallery, leaving remnant pillars (final) with the dimension of 3m by 3m. 
5th Phase – The 3m by 3m pillars are unstable in the long term, but they allow for a 6-month period in which it is possible to work safely in the last phase of stoping, that is the extraction (cleaning) with small excavators of the finer material that accumulated on the floor (threshold) and has an appreciable amount of tungsten due to the friability of wolframite. The 5th Phase is monitored with visual evaluation of the pillars and measuring of convergence roof-ground to verify the safety conditions within the stope. When the cleaning work is complete, the stope is abandoned and access is prohibited.

Ore processing

During decades there were three independent plants  and later they complemented each other: Panasqueira, Cabeço do Pião and Barroca Grande. Panasqueira Plant began to be built in the 19th century and was progressively transferred, from 1928, to Barroca Grande which has a more central location, more available area, greater access to water and other advantages that led to the Panasqueira Plant being totally deactivated in the 1960s. The Cabeço do Pião plant such as Panasqueira began to be built at the end of the 19th century. With the abandonment of this vein exploitation zone, and due to the greater availability of water of the Zêzere River, this plant only treated the pre-concentrates that came, first by aerial cable and later by truck from the Barroca Grande Plant. At the end of the 80s, the Panasqueira mine had enough extension so that its drainage water was sufficient to supply the necessary flow to the entire industrial structure; so between 1992 and 1996 in order to rationalize costs and due to environmental reasons the centralization of all ore concentration operations was done in Barroca Grande. 
The ore enrichment process has evolved greatly over time. In the beginning it began in the stopes with manual selection of the ore, reaching the plant with an enrichment of approximately 6 times in relation to its grade when stopped. It was difficult to do adequate manual selection in the stopes, therefore a coarser choice was done in the stopes, and a finer choice made in the Barroca Grande Plant in ore already washed, screened and with good lighting conditions. The pre-concentration continued by jigging and the pre-concentrate then went to the Cabeço do Pião plant.

With the increase of stope height due to increasing mechanization in the years 60 to 90, more waste were produced for the same amount of ore (dilution) resulting in higher amounts of low grade ore reaching the plant. It was necessary to replace the pre-concentration done by manual selection (handpicking) and jigging, with a more efficient method and with greater capacity to deal with the greater volume of ore plus waste that reached the plant. In 1971 a Heavy Medium separation  (HMS) was installed which carries out pre-concentration in a very effective way and with minimal losses. Due to improvement in the mine stopping method and greater need for fragmentation for the medium separation, a fines recovery circuit was installed in the 60's which was improved and expanded in the 80s. 
Currently, the ore is stopped with a grade of approximately 0.15% WO3 . Its concentration is in the first stages totally hydrogravitic. Taking advantage of the dense characteristic of the minerals to be exploited (volframite, cassiterite and chalcopyrite) and in the case of the Panasqueira of coarse mineralization.  After secondary crushing to 20mm the ore undergoes enrichment through dense medium and shaking tables until a pre-concentrate with approximately 6% of W03 is obtained. 
This pre-concentrate is then concentrated to grades close to those of final concentration in flotation tables, for the simultaneous enrichment of the dense particles and separation of the sulfides, which are then floated  to obtain a final copper concentrate (chalcopyrite). The dense pre-concentrate is then separated in tables and electromagnetic separation in wolfram (wolframite) and tin (cassiterite) concentrates.

Environmental Installations

The drainage water of the Panasqueira Mine is conducted to the surface through the Salgueira Gallery. This water has a pH of about 4 and contents heavy metals above the emission limit values. In the 1950s a wastewater treatment plant was installed, which, through alkalization with addition of lime, treats the water until it precipitates the heavy metals into sludge. This is then stored in the tailings dams. The treated water is pumped for use as industrial water in both the plant and the mine. Since the 50s, the mine has expanded and the effluent flow increased proportionally. In 2011 the water treatment plant was expanded and improved to treat all the water coming from the mine, the plant and the runoff of tailings dam. The non-reusable effluent resulting from the treatment is discharged to the Bodelhão Stream, complying with the monitoring program defined in Environmental License, with monthly reporting to the authorities. The plant reutilizes almost all the water that it uses, due to the use of several thickeners installed for this purpose.
The slimes resulting from water treatment, as well as the finer fraction of the plant tailings, are stored together in tailings dams. Any effluent from these dams is returned to the water treatment plant. The tailings in granulometry of sand and gravel are sold as inert materials for civil construction. The part that is not sold serves as a wall to the slimes dams.

Gallery

References

External links

Nice Article about the Panasqueira Mines
Panasqueira mineral specimens
Minas da Panasqueira
Panasqueira, História do património mineiro

Tungsten mines in Portugal
Underground mines in Portugal
Buildings and structures in Castelo Branco District